Tikunei haZohar (תקוני הזהר, lit. "Repairs of the Zohar"), also known as the Tikunim (תקונים), is a main text of the Kabbalah which was composed in the 14th century.

It is a separate appendix to the Zohar consisting of seventy commentaries on the opening word of the Torah, Bereishit ("in the beginning"), in the Midrashic style. The theme of Tikunei haZohar is to repair and support the Shekhinah or Malkhut — hence its name, "Repairs of the Zohar" — and to bring on the Redemption and conclude the Exile.

Tikunei haZohar was first printed in Mantua in 1558, followed by Constantinople editions in 1719 and 1740. Modern citations generally follow the 1740 pagination.

Language and authorship
Zoharic Aramaic is an artificial dialect largely based on a linguistic fusion of the Babylonian Talmud and Targum Onkelos, but confused by imperfect grammar, limited vocabulary, and loanwords from contemporary medieval languages.

Tikunei haZohar claims to have been composed by Shimon b. Yochai and his son Elazar. In fact, it was composed by a 14th century Kabbalist imitating the style of the 13th-century Zohar.

Tikunei haZohar contains some additions from later Kabbalists. For example, Shalom Buzaglo in his commentary Kisse Melekh p. 1a,  explains an exclamation in the text that was inserted by the Arizal (see below).

Jerusalem kabbalist Daniel Frisch (1935–2005) published a translation into Hebrew of Tikunei haZohar and of the Zohar itself called Matok miDvash (מתוק מדבש). It is written in common language and reinterprets the Zohar according to Lurianic Kabbalah.

Structure, Composition, and Topics
There are two introductions. The first introduction, pages 1a-16b, tells how the book developed after Shimon b. Yochai and his son fled from the Romans and hid in a cave; describes the Ten Sefirot according to their colors; tells the loftiness of the Tzadikim; gives some explanations of the seventy Tikkunim; and also tells eleven additional tikkunim:

The intro goes on to discuss more concepts regarding the book, interspersed with prayers.

The second introduction, pages 17a-17b, contains a similar account of flight to the cave etc., followed by Patach Eliyahu. Patach Eliyahu is Eliyahu's meditative prayer which contains foundations of Kabbalah, namely, that Hashem is one and indivisible, Creator of all, beyond comprehension, but Who reveals Himself to us by the Torah and the Kabbalah and conducts the world by orders such as the ten Sefirot, which correspond to the human form—though He Himself has no body or form. Eliyahu concludes his prayer, saying to Shimon, "Arise, Rabbi Shimon, and let words of novellae be revealed by you, for behold, you have permission to reveal hidden secrets, through you; such permission to reveal has not been given to any human until now." Patach Eliyahu is found in the daily liturgy of Sefardic Jews, and in the daily or weekly liturgy of various Chasidim. Tiqqunei ha-Zohar, 17a-b, Petaḥ Eliyahu in full:

As an example of some of the permutations of בראשית/Bereishit which underlie the seventy Tikunim, Tikun #1 begins by explaining "בראשית" as "ב' ראשית," (lit., beit [is] the "heading"), as in, "This is the gate to Hashem; the righteous shall enter into it" (Ps. 118:2) - "the righteous have  permission to enter in it [namely the Torah, Hashem's treasury], but the others who are not righteous are rejected from it." Tikun #2 explains "בראשית" as containing "יראת" (reverence [of]) and "שב" (return; repent); "the allusion is to return with reverence [of God]; without reverence, there can be no wisdom..." Tikun #3 mentions that "בראשית" contains "ברית אש/brit esh/Covenant [of] fire"—whoever guards the Covenant (i.e. circumcision, family purity and related matters) is saved from the fire of hell; and whoever is involved in Torah and guards the Covenant is called an "adam/man" fit to "sit" in the house (Isa. 44:13) and "see" the "ראש בית/rosh bayit/Head of the House," that is, the King, Hashem.

Certain passages of Tiqqunei ha-Zohar quote from the body of the Zohar, interpreting and developing it:

This page develops the account of creation with the Hebrew alphabet found in Zohar 1:2b-3b:

Commentaries
There are several explanations and commentaries on Tikunei haZohar. The more noted ones include: Kisse Melekh by Shalom Buzaglo, Ohr Yisrael by Yisrael of Koznitz, Biurei haGra on Tikunei Zohar (Vilna, Jewish year 5627), Chemdat Tzvi by Tzvi Hirsh, Be'er Yitzchak by Yitzchak Aizik of Polotsk, Be'er Lechai Ro'i by Tzvi Hirsh Shapira of Dinov [Dynow], Kegan haYarak by Kalfa Guedj, Netzutzei Zohar by Rav Reuven Margoliot, Metok Medvash by Rav Daniel Frisch, and the Sulam by Yehuda Ashlag.

Customs and influences
There is a custom amog some Jews to study Tikunei haZohar especially in the month of Elul, and also during the Ten Days of Repentance, since according to the kabbalists (including the Arizal) and many chasidic books, Tikunei haZohar repairs a person's spirit and cleanses his body and soul; therefore according to tradition, during these days which are called yemei teshuvah (days of repentance or drawing close to God), the repair of deeds is much greater. In some printed versions there is a partitioning of Tikunei haZohar over the forty days from the eve of Rosh Chodesh Elul to Yom Kippur, but this partitioning is not obligatory. In Chasidic communities (and others, more recently) it has been customary to publicize a list of praises of this custom and to distribute it and/or the book on the eve of Rosh Chodesh Elul

One particular influence of Tikunei haZohar is that Tikkun #21 is referenced in Likutei Moharan II #8 and other works of Nachman of Breslov in discussing "the song that will be awakened in the future" at the time of the ultimate Redemption and end of the exile: the "simple, double, triple and quadruple song ... Y YK YKW YKWK (K has been substituted for H to guard the sanctity of the Tetragrammaton)." Israel Dov Odesser and Na Nachs have understood the name and the song Na Nach Nachma Nachman (MeUman) as an aspect of this song.

References

External links
Aramaic Text and Hebrew Translations, Digital

 Entire Aramaic text, single webpage, no vowels, with daf numbers and line breaks, at hebrew.grimoar.cz (HTML/txt) Archived (808 kB)
 
 -
 Tikunei haZohar, by chapter or whole text, with vowels and citations, archive.org capture from ateret4u.com
 Tikunei Zohar PDF from dailyzohar.com - Scroll PDF online - Archive
 Complete Tikunei HaZohar Zoharic Aramaic - with prefaces. No copyright. dailyzohar.com / Mifal haZohar HaOlami

Tikunei Ha Zohar Tikune70 Partial Hebrew and Zoharic Aramaic https://drive.google.com/file/d/1J0YgOlqATWW0aeDVOpg8xTF_msYfvWfm/view?usp=sharing

Book Images
 Tikunei haZohar, Constantinople, 1740, at JNUL Digitized Book Repository (DjVu format) 
 
 

Classic Commentaries
  of Rav Shalom Buzaglo, student of Chaim Vital, at hebrewbooks.org
 Ma'alot haSulam by R' Yehuda Tzvi Brandwein, Vol. 22, Intro through Tik. 11;permanent link

Study Resources
 Daily (Tikunei) Zohar Study at dailyzohar.com, text and audio.
 Aramaic Language of the Zohar - Zoharic Aramaic Dictionary and Grammar.

English Translations

Part 1:
https://www.amazon.com/Sefer-Tiqqunei-HaZohar-English-Translation/dp/1798741164/ref=d_zg-te-pba_sccl_1_9/141-1940939-3890453?pd_rd_w=6fcGV&content-id=amzn1.sym.e4255960-36c0-425e-9849-651b7df9c86e&pf_rd_p=e4255960-36c0-425e-9849-651b7df9c86e&pf_rd_r=NHF2M2KEZB1MDGMCQNBF&pd_rd_wg=nYlpR&pd_rd_r=c3c07264-3a65-4f54-881e-876fcde4673d&pd_rd_i=1798741164&psc=1
Part 2:
https://www.amazon.com/Sefer-Tiqqunei-HaZohar-English-Translation/dp/1093532637/ref=d_zg-te-pba_sccl_1_6/141-1940939-3890453?pd_rd_w=6fcGV&content-id=amzn1.sym.e4255960-36c0-425e-9849-651b7df9c86e&pf_rd_p=e4255960-36c0-425e-9849-651b7df9c86e&pf_rd_r=NHF2M2KEZB1MDGMCQNBF&pd_rd_wg=nYlpR&pd_rd_r=c3c07264-3a65-4f54-881e-876fcde4673d&pd_rd_i=1093532637&psc=1
Part 3:
https://www.amazon.com/Sefer-Tiqqunei-HaZohar-English-Translation/dp/1093758155/ref=sr_1_fkmr1_2?crid=FT0AC54XVOHW&keywords=tikkunai+hazohar&qid=1665768789&qu=eyJxc2MiOiIwLjYxIiwicXNhIjoiMC4wMCIsInFzcCI6IjAuMDAifQ%3D%3D&sprefix=tikkunei+hazohar%2Caps%2C74&sr=8-2-fkmr1&ufe=app_do%3Aamzn1.fos.f5122f16-c3e8-4386-bf32-63e904010ad0
Tikkunei Zohar in English, Partial (Intro and Tikkun 1-17), at ha-zohar.info; permanent link

Kabbalah texts
Apocalyptic literature